Norman Scott Phillips is an American politician and management consultant who is a member of the Maryland House of Delegates for District 10 in Baltimore County, Maryland.

Career
Phillips attended Virginia Union University, where he was valedictorian of his class and earned a bachelor's degree in accounting in 1983, and the University of Maryland School of Law, where he earned his Juris Doctor degree in 1989. After graduating, Phillips worked as a minority business program manager at IBM, eventually becoming the director of its federal small business program. Before becoming a member of the Maryland House of Delegates, he worked as the Director of the Minority Business Development Agency Business Center in Baltimore, Maryland.

Phillips first became involved with politics in 2002, when he ran for the Maryland House of Delegates in District 10. He ran on a ticket with state senator Delores G. Kelley and state delegates Adrienne A. Jones and Shirley Nathan-Pulliam, but failed to advance out of the primary, coming in fourth with 17.3 percent of the vote.

In October 2012, Baltimore County executive Kevin Kamenetz named Phillips to serve as the chairman of the Baltimore County Planning Board.

In 2022, he again ran for the Maryland House of Delegates on a slate with Speaker of the Maryland House of Delegates Adrienne Jones, then-state delegate Benjamin Brooks, and nonprofit executive Jennifer White. He won the Democratic primary on July 19, receiving 11.8 percent of the vote.

In the legislature
Scott was sworn into the Maryland House of Delegates on January 11, 2023, with the start of the Maryland General Assembly's 445th legislative session. He is a member of the House Judiciary Committee.

Personal life
Scott is married to his wife of over 30 years, Valarie. Together, they have two daughters, Erin and Kaylyn.

Electoral history

References

External links
 

21st-century American politicians
African-American state legislators in Maryland
Democratic Party members of the Maryland House of Delegates
Living people
University of Maryland Francis King Carey School of Law alumni
Virginia Union University alumni
Maryland lawyers
Year of birth missing (living people)